Rachel Delaney (born 5 May 1997) is an Irish cricketer who plays for Scorchers and Ireland. She made her Women's One Day International cricket (WODI) debut against India in the 2017 South Africa Quadrangular Series on 7 May 2017. She made her Women's Twenty20 International cricket (WT20I) debut for Ireland against New Zealand on 6 June 2018.

References

External links
 
 

1997 births
Living people
Cricketers from Dublin (city)
Irish women cricketers
Ireland women One Day International cricketers
Ireland women Twenty20 International cricketers
Dragons (women's cricket) cricketers
Typhoons (women's cricket) cricketers
Scorchers (women's cricket) cricketers